The Incredible Hulk is an animated television series based on the Marvel Comics character of the same name. The series ran for 13 episodes on NBC in 1982, part of a combined hour with Spider-Man and His Amazing Friends (as The Incredible Hulk and the Amazing Spider-Man).

Compared to the live-action The Incredible Hulk television series from Universal, this series followed the Hulk comic books much more closely, particularly with regard to the Hulk's origin, the supporting cast (though Rio and his only daughter Rita do not appear in the comics), the army base setting, the heavy use of fantastical elements, and the Hulk being capable of speech (albeit limited). The series also retained from the comic book "Bruce Banner" as the name of the Hulk's human identity (rather than "David Banner" as in the live-action series).

This was the second Hulk animated series: in 1966, the Hulk appeared in 13 seven-minute segments as part of TV's The Marvel Super Heroes. The "Spidey Goes Hollywood" episode of Spider-Man and His Amazing Friends, first broadcast in late 1981, served as something of a backdoor pilot for The Incredible Hulk as it guest-starred the version of Bruce Banner/the Hulk that would later feature in the 1982 series.

Ownership of the series passed to Disney in 2001 when Disney acquired Fox Kids Worldwide, which also includes Marvel Productions. The series is not available on Disney+.

Plot 
The series focuses on Dr. Bruce Banner attempting to cure himself of his transformations into the Hulk, and the Hulk defeating various monsters and villains whilst fending off the army's attempts to subdue and capture him.

Production 
The 1982 Incredible Hulk series featured accompanying narration by Hulk co-creator Stan Lee. Some of the same background music tracks were used for Dungeons & Dragons. Boyd Kirkland, who became a writer/director for Batman: The Animated Series and X-Men: Evolution, was one of the layout artists for The Incredible Hulk.

The character design for both Bruce Banner and the Hulk were based on the artwork of Sal Buscema, who penciled the Incredible Hulk comic during the 1970s and 1980s. There is also the more frequently remembered quirk that whenever the Hulk transformed back to Bruce Banner, his clothes would miraculously return to normal (instead of being with only what is left of his pants, as happens in the comics and subsequent media). Also, the series would frequently reuse the same stock sequences when Banner transformed into the Hulk.

Characters 

 Bruce Banner: As in the original comic book, Dr Bruce Banner is an extremely intelligent physicist working in Gamma Base; during periods of stress or anger he transforms into the Hulk, a large, green-skinned, and muscular humanoid possessing a vast degree of physical strength but limited intelligence. Banner incurred this condition after being caught in the test explosion of a gamma bomb. Banner is depicted as seeking a cure for his condition.
 Rick Jones: Here, Rick is blond, wears a cowboy hat, and has a girlfriend named Rita. As in the early years of the comic books, Rick is the sole confidant of Banner's secret that he is actually the Hulk. The series retains from the comic book the plot-point that Rick feels partially responsible for Bruce Banner's condition, as Bruce was caught in an explosion whilst saving Rick, who was trespassing on the gamma bomb test site.
 Betty Ross: In this incarnation, Betty is a research scientist working alongside Bruce Banner at Gamma Base. Like the 1966 series, Betty is unaware that Banner transforms into the Hulk. As a brunette scientist, this version  of Betty Ross anticipates the portrayal of the character in the 2003 and 2008 live-action Hulk films.
 General Ross: This incarnation of General Ross is broadly similar to the character from the comic book, although his antagonism towards the Hulk is less virulent than that of his comic book counterpart. In fact, Ross concedes grudging admiration for his foe at the end of the episode "The Incredible Shrinking Hulk," when he admits the Hulk saved Gamma Base from destruction.
 Major Ned Talbot: In this version, Major Talbot's first name was changed from Glenn to Ned. He is nicknamed by the troops secretly as "Noodle-head Ned" because he is very clumsy, somewhat cowardly, sucks up to General Ross, and is often deceived by the enemy. This incarnation of Talbot acts as comic relief for the series; in this respect he is quite different from the Talbot of the comic book, who was portrayed as a dedicated and competent officer (albeit bearing a hatred of the Hulk and serving as Bruce Banner's rival for Betty Ross' affections).
 Rio: Rita's father, a character exclusive to this series; he owns and operates the diner "Rio's Ranchero," situated close to Gamma Base. Although not officially confirmed, in the second episode, it is clear that Rick reveals the secret of Bruce to him, whom too tries to help him as he can.
 Rita: Rio's daughter and Rick Jones's girlfriend, a character exclusive to this series. Although not officially confirmed, in the second episode, it is clear that Rick reveals the secret of Bruce to her, whom too tries to help him as she can.

Episodes

Cast 
Bruce Banner was played by voice actor Michael Bell, while the Hulk himself was voiced by Bob Holt, whose stock library of roars created for this series would be used in various other Marvel Productions series and movies.

 Michael Bell as Dr. Bruce Banner
 Pat Fraley as Major Ned Talbot
 Bob Holt as Hulk
 Michael Horton as Rick Jones
 Stan Lee as Narrator
 B. J. Ward as Betty Ross
 Susan Blu as Rita
 Roberto Cruz as Rio
 Bob Ridgely as General Thunderbolt Ross

Marvel Mash-Up 
Scenes from Spider-Man and His Amazing Friends and The Incredible Hulk were re-cut, edited, and re-dubbed into comical shorts as part of Disney XD's Marvel Mash-Up shorts for their "Marvel Universe on Disney XD" block of programming that includes Ultimate Spider-Man and The Avengers: Earth's Mightiest Heroes.

Home media
The series was planned for release on Region 2 DVD in the UK in August 2008 by Liberation Entertainment as part of a release schedule of Marvel animated series. However, due to unforeseen circumstances the release day was pushed back to October, and then again to November 3. Liberation Entertainment then closed its UK division, making 12 staff redundant. This brought many delays to the releases.

Lace International bought the rights to distribute the series on DVD. Amazon.co.uk was the first store to receive stocks of the resulting two disc DVD set, which includes a short restoration featurette.

Clear Vision re-released the series on DVD in the UK on the June 7, 2010.

References

External links 

 
 
 The Incredible Hulk 1982 Cartoon Webpage 

1982 American television series debuts
1983 American television series endings
Hulk (comics) television series
NBC original programming
Television shows based on Marvel Comics
Television series by Marvel Productions
Animated television series based on Marvel Comics
1980s American animated television series
American children's animated superhero television series
American children's animated action television series
American children's animated adventure television series
American children's animated science fantasy television series
Television series by Disney–ABC Domestic Television
Television series by Saban Entertainment